Myrdal is a surname. Notable people with the surname include:
 Alva Myrdal (1902–1986), Swedish diplomat, politician and writer
 Arne Myrdal (1935-2007), Norwegian anti-immigrant activist
 Gunnar Myrdal (1898–1987), Swedish economist and politician
 Jan Myrdal (1927-2020), Swedish author, leftist-political writer and columnist
 Janne Myrdal, Norwegian-born American member of the North Dakota Senate
 Rosemarie Myrdal (born 1929), North Dakota Republican Party politician